Thornton railway station served the village of Thornton, Leicestershire, England, from 1832 to 1842 on the Leicester and Swannington Railway.

History
The station was opened as Stag and Castle Inn on 18 July 1832 by the Leicester and Swannington Railway. Its name was changed to Thornton in 1841. It closed on 1 January 1842.

References

Transport in Leicester
Disused railway stations in Leicestershire
Railway stations in Great Britain opened in 1832
Railway stations in Great Britain closed in 1842
1832 establishments in England
1842 disestablishments in England